The Merry EP was announced in the Fall of 2009 via fan newsletter, and the readers were asked to submit ideas for songs to be recorded. The official track list was released in October when it was available for pre-order. Of the EP, Gregory said:

Track list

 Last Christmas (G. Michael)
 What A Long Year It Was (G. Douglass)
 Walking In The Air (Originally from "The Snow Man")
 God Rest Ye Merry Gentlemen
 O Holy Night

Gregory Douglass albums
2009 EPs